KERI (1410 kHz "Faith & Family 1410 AM") is a commercial AM radio station in Bakersfield, California.  The station is owned by Robert and Luann Wilkins, through licensee Bob Wilkins Radio Network Broadcasting, Inc.  It airs a religious radio format.  Most hours are brokered programming, where national and local religious leaders pay for a segment of time, for preaching or instruction, and where they may appeal to listeners for donations.  Hosts include Charles Stanley, Jim Daly, John MacArthur, David Jeremiah and Jay Sekulow.

KERI is powered at 1,000 watts, day and night, using a non-directional antenna.  Its transmitter is located on Kimber Avenue in Bakersfield, off Route 58 - Exit 115.  KERI's studios and offices are on Easton Drive in Bakersfield.

History
On May 17, 1950, the station first sign-on signed on as KWSO, a 250-watt daytimer at 1050 kHz, owned by Maple Leaf Broadcasting.  It was licensed to Wasco, California, about 25 miles northwest of Bakersfield.  By the 1960s, the station had assorted programs including middle of the road and classical music, farm and news reports and religious programs.  The station's signal was limited to the area around Wasco, and was reflected in the KWSO call letters.

In the early 1980s, the Federal Communications Commission allowed KWSO to move to 1180 kHz, coupled with a boost in power to 10,000 watts by day and nighttime authorization, running at 1000 watts after sunset, using a directional antenna.  With this new power, the station could be heard around the larger Bakersfield radio market.  It switched to a full-time religious format, changing its call sign to KERI, which stands for "Kern County inspirational programming".  (The 1050 frequency is now occupied by KJPG in nearby Frazier Park, California, airing a Catholic radio format.)

In the early 2000s, the station got another power boost, this time powered at its current 50,000 watts by day and 10,000 watts at night.  Its city of license was changed to two communities, Wasco and Greenacres.  In 2004, the station was bought by American General Media, which owns five other stations in the Bakersfield market.

On January 1, 2009, a frequency swap with talk radio sister station KERN 1410 AM was made. The talk format on KERN was moved to the more powerful 1180 frequency, while the religious format on KERI switched to AM 1410.  (For the history of the 1410 frequency, see KERN.)  After the switch was made, KERI 1410 was sold to the Watkins Radio Network, which owns about 30 other religious stations around the U.S.

Previous logo

References

External links
FCC History Cards for KERI
Corporate website
Fybush.com Tower Site of the Week photos of radio towers in Bakersfield

ERI
ERI
Radio stations established in 2008